During World War II, the United States Army Air Forces established numerous airfields in Texas for training pilots and aircrews. The amount of available land and the temperate climate made Texas a prime location for year-round military training. By the end of the war, 65 Army airfields were built in the state.

Airfields

See also

Western Flying Training Command

References

External links
Abandoned & Little-Known Airfields:Texas
Texas Time Travel World War II

 01
World War II
World War II
Airfields of the United States Army Air Forces in the United States by state
United States World War II army airfields